Branntjernhøgda  is a mountain of Viken, in southern Norway.

Lunner
Mountains of Viken